Andy Roddick defeated David Nalbandian in the final, 6–1, 6–3 to win the men's singles tennis title at the 2003 Canada Masters.

Guillermo Cañas was the reigning champion, but did not compete that year.

Seeds
A champion seed is indicated in bold text while text in italics indicates the round in which that seed was eliminated.

  Andre Agassi (quarterfinals)
  Juan Carlos Ferrero (third round)
  Roger Federer (semifinals)
  Carlos Moyá (first round)
  Lleyton Hewitt (second round)
  Andy Roddick (champion)
  Guillermo Coria (first round)
  Rainer Schüttler (semifinals)
  Sébastien Grosjean (third round)
  Jiří Novák (third round)
  Paradorn Srichaphan (third round)
  Sjeng Schalken (first round)
  Gustavo Kuerten (first round)
  Fernando González (first round)
  Martin Verkerk (second round)
  Tommy Robredo (third round)

Draw

Finals

Top half

Section 1

Section 2

Bottom half

Section 3

Section 4

External links
 2003 Canada Masters Draw

2003 Canada Masters and the Rogers AT&T Cup
Singles